Casa Conejo (Spanish for "Rabbit House") is an unincorporated county island in Newbury Park, Ventura County, California, United States. It was the first planned community in Newbury Park and began building in 1960. When the city of Thousand Oaks incorporated 4 years later, the new developments in Newbury Park were incorporated into the city boundaries before being subdivided. The community is bordered by Old Conejo Road and US 101 to the north, Borchard Road to the south, Jenny Drive to the west, and Sequoia Middle School to the east. For statistical purposes, the United States Census Bureau has defined Casa Conejo as a census-designated place (CDP). The census definition of the area may not precisely correspond to local understanding of the area with the same name. The population was 3,249 at the 2010 census, up from 3,180 at the 2000 census. Casa Conejo is located in a roughly rectangle-shaped unincorporated area surrounded by the city of Thousand Oaks.

The Casa Conejo Municipal Advisory Council (MAC) serves Casa Conejo residents, and makes recommendations to the Board of Supervisors. Its purpose is to provide a forum for Casa Conejo residents to discuss issues and come with ideas to the Board of Supervisors. While numerous other unincorporated islands were ultimately annexed by the City of Thousand Oaks during the 1980s, Casa Conejo voters rejected such efforts and remains an unincorporated pocket surrounded by Newbury Park. While Newbury Park is in Thousand Oaks, Casa Conejo is in Newbury Park but not in Thousand Oaks.

Geography

Casa Conejo is an unincorporated county island which is surrounded by Newbury Park. The borders of Casa Conejo make its shape more or less a quadrangle. Casa Conejo borders Borchard Road to the south and the Sequoia Middle School to the east. It is bounded by the Old Conejo Road and U.S. 101 Freeway to the north, while it is adjacent to Borchard Community Park, Newbury Park High School and Knoll Park to the east.

Casa Conejo is the oldest planned development in the town of Newbury Park, and is a smaller and more close-knit community than Newbury Park proper. It is often referred to as a neighborhood with a “small town-feel”. While Newbury Park is home to more than 37,700, Casa Conejo is a community of 1,000 homes as of 2016. As of the U.S. Census 2010, the total population of Casa Conejo was 3,249 (8.6% of Newbury Park's total population). The population has been relatively stagnant for decades in Casa Conejo: the U.S. Census of 1990 reported a total population of 3,180, down from 3,286 in 1980.

Conejo Valley's longest creek, Arroyo Conejo, flows westwards and crosses horizontally the southern part of Casa Conejo. A multi-use pathway along the creek has been proposed, which would cross the community and connect the Newbury Park Library and Borchard Community Park. The path would be open for pedestrians, bikers and equestrians, resembling Simi Valley's Arroyo Simi. The waterway is managed by the Ventura County Watershed Protection District, while the Conejo Recreation and Park District (CRPD) would overlook the proposed recreational multipurpose walkway.

Demographics

2010
The 2010 United States Census reported that Casa Conejo had a population of 3,249. The racial makeup of Casa Conejo was 2,560 (78.8%) White, 27 (0.8%) African American, 20 (0.6%) Native American, 160 (4.9%) Asian, 4 (0.1%) Pacific Islander, 327 (10.1%) from other races, and 151 (4.6%) from two or more races. Hispanic or Latino of any race were 851 persons (26.2%).

The Census reported that 3,243 people (99.8% of the population) lived in households, 6 (0.2%) lived in non-institutionalized group quarters, and 0 (0%) were institutionalized.

There were 990 households, out of which 431 (43.5%) had children under the age of 18 living in them, 627 (63.3%) were opposite-sex married couples living together, 110 (11.1%) had a female householder with no husband present, 63 (6.4%) had a male householder with no wife present There were 54 (5.5%) unmarried opposite-sex partnerships, and 6 (0.6%) same-sex married couples or partnerships. 122 households (12.3%) were made up of individuals, and 68 (6.9%) had someone living alone who was 65 years of age or older. The average household size was 3.28. There were 800 families (80.8% of all households); the average family size was 3.47.

The population was spread out, with 819 people (25.2%) under the age of 18, 285 people (8.8%) aged 18 to 24, 884 people (27.2%) aged 25 to 44, 887 people (27.3%) aged 45 to 64, and 374 people (11.5%) who were 65 years of age or older The median age was 38.4 years. For every 100 females there were 103.3 males.  For every 100 females age 18 and over, there were 102.8 males.

The homeowner vacancy rate was 0.8%; the rental vacancy rate was 2.3 2,577 people (79.3% of the population) lived in owner-occupied housing units and 666 people (20.5%) lived in rental housing units.

2000
As of the census of 2000, there were 3,180 people, 985 households, and 809 families residing in the CDP. The racial makeup of the CDP was 85.44% White, 1.01% African American, 0.28% Native American, 3.40% Asian, 0.38% Pacific Islander, 6.32% from other races, and 3.18% from two or more races. Hispanic or Latino of any race were 15.79% of the population.

There were 985 households, out of which 42.4% had children under the age of 18 living with them, 67.6% were married couples living together, 9.9% had a female householder with no husband present, and 17.8% were non-families. 11.6% of all households were made up of individuals, and 5.8% had someone living alone who was 65 years of age or older The average household size was 3.22 and the average family size was 3.45.

In the CDP the population was spread out, with 28.2% under the age of 18, 7.5% from 18 to 24, 33.6% from 25 to 44, 20.3% from 45 to 64, and 10.4% who were 65 years of age or older. The median age was 35 years. For every 100 females there were 99.6 males. For every 100 females age 18 and over, there were 100.5 males.

The median income for a household in the CDP was $66,120, and the median income for a family was $64,345. Males had a median income of $41,806 versus $35,511 for females. The per capita income for the CDP was $21,896. About 2.3% of families and 3.3% of the population were below the poverty line, including 3.2% of those under age 18 and 4.4% of those age 65 or over.

See also
Ventu Park
 Dos Vientos

Notable people
Linda Parks

References

External links

Newbury Park, California
Census-designated places in Ventura County, California
Conejo Valley